Brigadier Euston Edward Francis Baker  (5 April 1895 – 17 January 1981) was a British Army officer of both world wars.

Military career
Baker was born in Fulham, London. He commissioned into the 5th Battalion, Middlesex Regiment on 15 August 1914 and saw active service in the First World War. During the war he was mentioned in dispatches three times, and was twice awarded the Military Cross - in 1917 and 1918. In February 1919 he was awarded the Distinguished Service Order for his actions in the Battle of the Scarpe (1918).

In February 1923 Baker was promoted to lieutenant colonel and took command of the 8th Battalion, Middlesex Regiment. In 1931 he became Commanding Officer of the 7th Battalion, City of London Regiment, before retaking command of the 8th Battalion, Middlesex Regiment from 1936 to 1937. He was made a Commander of the Order of the British Empire on 23 June 1936 and in 1938 became a Deputy lieutenant for Middlesex. Following the outbreak of the Second World War he became Commanding Officer of the 35th Infantry Brigade, serving in the position until April 1940. From October 1940 to July 1942 Baker was commander of the 213th Independent Infantry Brigade. He retired from the regular army due to ill health in March 1945 with the rank of brigadier.

Between June 1941 and June 1951, Baker was an Additional aide-de-camp to George VI, and was Honorary Colonel of the 5th Battalion, Middlesex Regiment from 1942 to 1963. In October 1947 Baker became Honorary Colonel of 11th Parachute Battalion (Middlesex). He was made a Companion of the Order of the Bath in 1957.

References

External links
British Army Officers 1939−1945
Generals of World War II

1895 births
1981 deaths
British Army personnel of World War I
British Army brigadiers of World War II
Commanders of the Order of the British Empire
Companions of the Distinguished Service Order
Companions of the Order of the Bath
Deputy Lieutenants of Middlesex
English justices of the peace
London Regiment officers
Middlesex Regiment officers
People from Fulham
Recipients of the Military Cross
Military personnel from London